Toledo East is an electoral constituency in the Toledo District represented in the House of Representatives of the National Assembly of Belize since 2012 by Michael Espat of the People's United Party. Espat also served several non-consecutive terms in the constituency dating back to 1989.

Profile

The Toledo East constituency was one of 10 new seats created for the 1984 general election. It is one of two constituencies in the rural Toledo District of southern Belize, currently comprising the district's coastal areas including Punta Gorda and Monkey River Town.

Toledo East is a very competitive constituency, routinely changing hands between the PUP and the UDP since its creation. In 2003 Espat became the constituency's only Area Representative re-elected to a consecutive term to date.

Area Representatives

Elections

References

Political divisions in Belize
Toledo East
Belizean House constituencies established in 1984